Sorin Coțofană is a Quantum & Computer engineering Professor at Delft University of Technology.  He was named a Fellow of the Institute of Electrical and Electronics Engineers (IEEE) in 2017 for contributions to nanocomputing architectures and paradigms.

Education and career
Coțofană earned his M.Sc. degree in computer science from  Politehnica University of Bucharest, Romania in 1984. He then moved to the Netherlands where he studied electrical engineering at Delft University of Technology, graduating with a Ph.D. in 1998.  Currently he serves on the faculty of Electrical Engineering, Mathematics and Computer Science of Delft University of Technology in Delft, The Netherlands.

From 2009 to 2011, Coțofană served as associate editor of IEEE Transactions on Circuits and Systems I and from 2008 to 2014 held the same position at the IEEE Transactions on Nanotechnology. Between those appointments, he also was a chair of the Giga-Nano IEEE CASS Technical Committee from 2013 to 2015 and the IEEE Nano Council CASS representative from 2013 to 2014. From 2016 to 2017, he was a member of the Senior Editorial Board of the IEEE Journal on Emerging and Selected Topics in Circuits and Systems and from 2014 to 2018 served on the Steering Committee of the IEEE Transactions on Multi-Scale Computing Systems.

References

External links

20th-century births
Living people
Romanian computer scientists
Politehnica University of Bucharest alumni
Academic staff of the Delft University of Technology
Year of birth missing (living people)
Place of birth missing (living people)